Alizée Gaillard (born 28 April 1985), sometimes credited as Alizée Sorel, is a Haitian-Swiss fashion model. Gaillard began her modeling career in 2005, after winning season one of the French edition of America's Next Top Model. Afterwards, she signed to Elite Model Management.

Early years
Gaillard was born to a Haitian father and a Swiss mother in Geneva. Gaillard moved to Pétion-Ville in Haiti when she was two months old, and spent her early childhood there until the age of eight, when she moved back to Switzerland with her family. On 15 December 2013, she married American actor Darrin Charles in a ceremony in Los Angeles.

Career
In 2005, she won the first cycle of France's Next Top Model, promoted by channel M6. Since then, she has worked for Alexander McQueen, L’Oréal, Louis Vuitton, Prada, etc.  Gaillard is signed with Elite Model Management.  Through her career, she became involved in several charity associations, like Caritas.

References

External links
 
 https://www.imdb.com/name/nm6853471/

1985 births
Living people
Haitian female models
Haitian people of Swiss descent
Next Top Model winners
Models from Geneva
People from Port-au-Prince
Swiss female models
Swiss people of Haitian descent
Naturalized citizens of the United States